Eloxochitlán is a village and one of the 84 municipalities of Hidalgo, in central-eastern Mexico. The municipality covers an area of 200.4 km².

In 2005, the municipality had a total population of 2,417.

References

Municipalities of Hidalgo (state)
Populated places in Hidalgo (state)